Prostitution in the United Arab Emirates is illegal. Punishments for engaging in prostitution include heavy fines and imprisonment, with foreign prostitutes typically being deported from the UAE. In 2006 the UAE deported 4,300 foreign prostitutes. Despite its illegality, prostitution is widespread, especially in Dubai and Abu Dhabi. The authorities generally turn a blind eye provided it is kept out of the public eye. 

UAE nationals are permitted a number of residence visas. These are mainly used for domestic staff, but any surplus are often sold through middlemen to prostitutes to enter and remain in the country for two years. Residence visas may change hands at upwards of £5,000. Despite a law forbidding entry to unaccompanied females under 31 years of age, "agents arrange for prostitutes to enter the country on a 30-day tourist visa.

Although there is street prostitution, notably Hamdan Street in Abu Dhabi, most prostitution takes place in the bars and nightclubs of hotels.

Dubai
Sex trade in Dubai has been prevalent for many years. In 1936, Sheikh Saeed's wali forced the prostitutes to get married or to leave. During the 1950s and 1960s, two madams controlled the Persian prostitutes. One controlled the red-light district in Bur Dubai, the other around Nasser Square (now Baniyas Square). Sheikh Rashid ordered that all the prostitutes were rounded up and deported. This caused a run on the local British bank when the women tried to draw out all their savings.

Modern Dubai is one of the main centres of prostitution in the UAE and is dubbed "Sodom-sur-Mer". Prostitutes frequent the bars and nightclubs in the hotels. Many prostitutes from poorer countries, such as Nigeria, come to work in Dubai for a short while and then return home with their earnings.

Prostitution, although prohibited, is prevalent and easily accessible in Dubai. Women engaged in this business operate in brothels or massage establishments situated in the city's red-light areas. However, it is not only women, but also men who offer their services in the city. Typically, red-light districts are located in the city's more established areas, such as Deira and Bur Dubai.

There are also brothels in Dubai. The Cyclone, near the airport was closed down in 2007 after it was featured in Vanity Fair magazine, but the operation simply set up at another location. Known by visitors as the "United Nations of prostitution", the club has as many as 500 prostitutes on the premises on an average night, many from China, Azerbaijan, Kazakhstan, Kyrgyzstan, Tajikistan, Uzbekistan, Russia, Ukraine, Bulgaria and Taiwan. 

The Cyclone appeared in the 2008 Leonardo DiCaprio and Russell Crowe film Body of Lies.

Human trafficking is a problem in Dubai, often Chinese or other Asian criminal groups force women from China or India or Nepal into prostitution in UAE. There are many Iranian prostitutes in Dubai and some of them stay in the city for a long time. In 2014, Iranian Immigration & Passport Police Office announced that the number of Iranian prostitutes in the UAE is growing.

Over the years, Dubai emerged as an influencer capital of the world, where the social media influencers used their popularity to depict the city’s extravagance. However, on the dark side of influencer marketing culture in Dubai were several influencers who had been funding their lifestyle by selling sex for thousands of pounds. Influencers get direct messages from men on Instagram, respond to them and agree to meet. Men pay them with flights, jewellery, bags and cash. Besides, interviews revealed that influencers with more followers are paid more.

Sex tourism
The UAE attracts many foreign businessmen as it is gaining a reputation as the Middle East's top sex tourism destination. Many of them arrive regularly from the post-Soviet states, South America, Eastern Europe, East Asia, Africa, South Asia, and other states of the Middle East.

Sex trafficking

In 2007, the United States State Department placed the United Arab Emirates as a "Tier 2" in its annual Trafficking in Persons reports, meaning that it does not fully comply with the minimum standards for the elimination of trafficking but is making significant efforts to do so. The UAE is a destination and transit country for women subjected to sex trafficking. Some women, predominantly from Eastern Europe, Central Asia, South and Southeast Asia, East Africa, Iraq, Iran, and Morocco, are subjected to forced prostitution in the UAE. In 2016, 22 cases related to sex trafficking were brought before the courts.

References

United Arab Emirates
Crime in the United Arab Emirates
United Arab Emirates
Prostitution in Asia
Women's rights in the United Arab Emirates
Human rights in the United Arab Emirates
Society of the United Arab Emirates
Social issues in the United Arab Emirates